Georg Johan Casimir Ehrnrooth (born 16 January 1966) is a Finnish investor, the major owner with his brothers of Finnish HEX exchange stock companies EQ Bank, YIT and Pöyry.

Family 

Father Casimir Ehrnrooth (1931–2015) held possessions in banking. Georg’s siblings are Henrik (1954), Johanna, painter (1958–2020), and Carl-Gustaf (1969).

Business 
Georg Ehrnrooth owns, with his brothers, investment companies Structor S.A, Corbis S.A. Fennogens Investments S.A. in Luxembourg. These companies are the major owners of EQ Bank, the construction company YIT and the construction and forest industry consulting company Pöyry.

Fines 
Georg Ehrnrooth and Jorma Ollila were fined for Luxembourg investments in 2014. Georg Ehrnrooth failed to reveal a Luxembourg-based investment company that he controlled, known as Partum. At the end of 2012, Partum was worth 26 million euros but has since been dissolved. Ehrnrooth told regulators that he had neglected to disclose of the investment company to the insider register in error. In 2016 Yle reported that Georg and  Henrik Ehrnrooth own a company in Luxemburg that organize Tax haven companies for their customers including Jorma Ollila and Kari Stadigh. Company made years cooperation with Mossack Fonseca in Panama.

References

1966 births
Living people
Finnish businesspeople
Swedish-speaking Finns